Shunyi District is an administrative district of Beijing, located to the northeast of the city's urban core. As of 2014, the population of the district is around 983,000, of which approximately 601,000 have local residency permits. The Beijing Capital International Airport is located in the geographical boundaries of the district, though it is technically under the jurisdiction of Chaoyang district. Shunyi borders the Beijing districts of Pinggu to the east, Tongzhou to the south, Chaoyang to the southwest, Changping to the west, Huairou to the north, and Miyun to the northeast, as well as Hebei province to the southeast.

Shunyi has large communities of foreign expatriates.

Overview
The district is divided into 5 subdistricts of the city of Shunyi, the Airport subdistrict, and 19 towns. Other important urban areas are Tianzhu/Jichang (55,000 estimated population, Jichang is an exclave of Chaoyang District surrounded by Shunyi District), Houshayu (45,000), Yangzhen (22,000), and Mapo (22,000).

The Tianzhu Development Zone region abutting the airport to the west contains the largest international exhibition centre in China, the New China International Exhibition Center.

The International School of Beijing (ISB) is located in Shunyi District in the region known as the "Beijing Central Villas District" - the area immediately to the south of the new International Exhibition Centre - and more particularly just north of Yosemite Villas. Across the road from ISB is the new campus of the British School of Beijing which moved to this location during the summer of 2009. From west to east, the villas include EuroVillage, River Garden, Le Leman Lake, Capital Paradise, Gahood, Yosemite and Dragon Bay Villa and Rose & Gingko. In addition to having many different housing complexes there are also several small shopping malls nearby including Europlaza, Pinnacle Plaza and Lakeview.

The Beijing 2008 Olympics rowing, canoeing, and kayaking events were held at the newly built Shunyi Olympic Rowing-Canoeing Park.

When Beijing Capital International Airport was first built, Shunyi was a subdistrict of Chaoyang. When Shunyi was promoted to full districtship, Chaoyang maintained direct control over the airport, so although the airport is completely surrounded by Shunyi district, it is not administratively in Shunyi; it pays its taxes to the Chaoyang government.

Administrative divisions
There are 6 subdistricts and 19 towns with 7 towns of which carry the "area" label within the district:

Transport
The district is linked to the city proper through a series of arterial roads. The Northern Approach Route of the Airport Expressway passes through Shunyi District. Shunyi district is served by Line 15 of the Beijing Subway.

The urban center of Shunyi is near the north-eastern 6th Ring Road.

Metro
Shunyi is currently served by two metro lines operated by Beijing Subway:

  - China International Exhibition Center, Hualikan, Houshayu, Nanfaxin, Shimen, Shunyi, Fengbo
  - Terminal 3

Economy

In 2017, the regional GDP of the district is 171.59 billion yuan, with GDP per capita at 152.1 thousand yuan.

Air China has its headquarters in Zone A of the Tianzhu Airport Industrial Zone in the Shunyi District. Okay Airways has its headquarters in a separate Air China facility.

Beijing Hyundai Motor Company, a joint-venture with Korean auto manufacturer Hyundai Motor Company and the Beijing Automotive Industry Holding Co. has its head office and factory in the Linhe Industrial Development Zone in Shunyi District.

Ritchie Bros Auctioneers (Beijing) Co. Ltd., a subsidiary of Ritchie Bros. Auctioneers of Canada, is an investor in the Tianzhu Free Trade Zone and is the first wholly foreign-owned auction company in China.

Diplomatic missions
The warehouse of the Embassy of the United States, Beijing is located in the Beijing Tianzhu Airport Industrial Zone in Shunyi.

Education

Public high schools:
 Beijing Shunyi District No. 1 High School
 Niulanshan No.1 High School
 Beijing Shunyi District Yangzhen No. 1 Middle School (zh)

International schools located in Shunyi District include:
 International School of Beijing Shunyi Campus
 The British School of Beijing, Shunyi
 Dulwich College Beijing
 International Montessori School of Beijing River Garden Campus and Champagne Cove Campus
 Beijing New Talent Academy
 Beijing International Bilingual Academy
 Springboard International Bilingual School

Closed:
 Swedish School Beijing - Gahood Villa
 Beijing REGO British School

Notable areas
Pinnacle Plaza
China International Exhibition Center
Shunyi Olympic Rowing-Canoeing Park

Climate 

Shunyi District has a humid continental climate (Köppen climate classification Dwa).

Gallery

References

External links

Greenshunyi (顺义)
Newshunyi (顺义)

 
Districts of Beijing